King Lear (1983) is a video production of William Shakespeare's 1606 play of the same name, directed by Michael Elliott. It was broadcast in 1983 in the UK and in 1984 in the US.

Production and release
Elliott set his Lear in an environment resembling Stonehenge, although the production was entirely shot in a studio. The somewhat out-of-focus effect that one sees at certain moments is because mist pervades the setting in several scenes. In keeping with the primitive backdrop, this production emphasizes the primitive over the sophisticated. Shakespeare's characters use the clothing, weapons, and technology of the early Bronze Age rather than the Elizabethan era.

Laurence Olivier played Lear in this production to great acclaim, winning an Emmy for his performance. It was the last of Olivier's appearances in a Shakespeare play. At 75, he was one of the oldest actors to take on this enormously demanding role. (He had previously played it in 1946 at the Old Vic, without much success).

A notable cast was assembled for this production, including, in addition to Olivier, John Hurt (Fool), Diana Rigg (Regan), Leo McKern (Gloucester), Dorothy Tutin (Goneril), Anna Calder-Marshall (Cordelia), David Threlfall (Edgar), Colin Blakely (Kent), and Robert Lindsay (Edmund). The set designer was Tanya Moiseiwitsch.

The American syndicated telecasts featured an introduction shot at the real Stonehenge, featuring Peter Ustinov as host. (Ustinov was host for all the Mobil Showcase Theatre presentations, of which the Olivier King Lear was one.) It has been released on DVD in both Region 1 and Region 2 editions.

Cast
 Laurence Olivier — King Lear
 Colin Blakely — Earl of Кеnt
 Anna Calder-Marshall — Cordelia, King Lear's daughter
 Jeremy Kemp — Duke of Cornwall
 Robert Lang — Duke of Albany
 Robert Lindsay — Edmund, Gloucester's son
 Leo McKern — Earl of Gloucester
 David Threlfall — Edgar, Gloucester's son
 Dorothy Tutin — Goneril, King Lear's daughter John Hurt — Fool Diana Rigg — Regan, King Lear's daughter Brian Cox — Duke of Burgundy Edward Petherbridge — King of France Awards 
 1983 — International Emmy Awards — Drama.
 1984 — Primetime Emmy Awards — Outstanding Lead Actor in a Limited Series or a Special (Laurence Olivier).
 1984 — BAFTA TV Award'' nominations: Best Make Up (Lois Richardson), Best Costume Design (Tanya Moiseiwitsch), Best Video Cameraman (Roger England).

References

External links 
 

1983 television plays
British television plays
Filmed stage productions